Dahme-Heideseen Nature Park is a nature park and reserve in the state of Brandenburg, Germany. It covers an area of 594 km2 (229 sq mi). It was established September 19, 1998 and is located southeast of Berlin.

External links 

Nature parks in Brandenburg